The 2020-21 North Dakota Fighting Hawks men's ice hockey season was the 79th season of play for the program and the 8th in the NCHC conference. The Fighting Hawks represented the University of North Dakota and were coached by Brad Berry, in his 6th season. The first ten regular season games were played in a "pod" in Omaha, Nebraska at Baxter Arena during the COVID-19 pandemic. North Dakota won its 4th Penrose Cup as regular season champions of the NCHC. UND won the NCHC tournament for the first time in program history.

Season
As a result of the ongoing COVID-19 pandemic the entire college ice hockey season was delayed. Because the NCAA had previously announced that all winter sports athletes would retain whatever eligibility they possessed through at least the following year, none of North Dakota's players would lose a season of play. However, the NCAA also approved a change in its transfer regulations that would allow players to transfer and play immediately rather than having to sit out a season, as the rules previously required.

Departures

Recruiting

Roster
As of December 31, 2020.

Standings

Schedule and Results

|-
!colspan=12 style=";" | Regular season

|-
!colspan=12 style=";" | 

|-
!colspan=12 style=";" |

Scoring statistics

Goaltending statistics

Rankings

USCHO did not release a poll in week 20.

Awards and honors

Players drafted into the NHL

2021 NHL Entry Draft

† incoming freshman

References

North Dakota Fighting Hawks men's ice hockey seasons
North Dakota Fighting Hawks
North Dakota Fighting Hawks
North Dakota Fighting Hawks
North Dakota Fighting Hawks
North Dakota Fighting Hawks